Robert Michael Ballantyne (24 April 1825 – 8 February 1894) was a Scottish author of juvenile fiction, who wrote more than a hundred books. He was also an accomplished artist: he exhibited some of his water-colours at the Royal Scottish Academy.

Early life
Ballantyne was born in Edinburgh on 24 April 1825, the ninth of ten children and the youngest son, to Alexander Thomson Ballantyne (1776–1847) and his wife Anne (1786–1855). Alexander was a newspaper editor and printer in the family firm of "Ballantyne & Co" based at Paul's Works on the Canongate, and Robert's uncle James Ballantyne (1772–1833) was the printer for Scottish author Sir Walter Scott. In 1832-33 the family is known to have been living at 20 Fettes Row, in the northern New Town of Edinburgh. A UK-wide banking crisis in 1825 resulted in the collapse of the Ballantyne printing business the following year with debts of £130,000, which led to a decline in the family's fortunes.

Ballantyne went to Canada aged 16, and spent five years working for the Hudson's Bay Company. He traded with the local First Nations and Native Americans for furs, which required him to travel by canoe and sleigh to the areas occupied by the modern-day provinces of Manitoba, Ontario, and Quebec, experiences that formed the basis of his novel The Young Fur Traders (1856). His longing for family and home during that period impressed him to start writing letters to his mother. Ballantyne recalled in his autobiographical Personal Reminiscences in Book Making (1893) that "To this long-letter writing I attribute whatever small amount of facility in composition I may have acquired."

Writing career
In 1847 Ballantyne returned to Scotland to discover that his father had died. He published his first book the following year, Hudson's Bay: or, Life in the Wilds of North America, and for some time was employed by the publishers Messrs Constable. In 1856 he gave up business to focus on his literary career, and began the series of adventure stories for the young with which his name is popularly associated.

The Young Fur-Traders (1856), The Coral Island (1857), The World of Ice (1859), Ungava: a Tale of Eskimo Land (1857), The Dog Crusoe (1860), The Lighthouse (1865), Fighting the Whales (1866), Deep Down (1868), The Pirate City (1874), Erling the Bold (1869), The Settler and the Savage (1877), and more than 100 other books followed in regular succession, his rule being to write as far as possible from personal knowledge of the scenes he described. The Gorilla Hunters. A tale of the wilds of Africa (1861) shares three characters with The Coral Island: Jack Martin, Ralph Rover and Peterkin Gay. Here Ballantyne relied factually on Paul du Chaillu's Exploration in Equatorial Guinea, which had appeared early in the same year.

The Coral Island is the most popular of the Ballantyne novels still read and remembered today, but because of one mistake he made in that book, in which he gave an incorrect thickness of coconut shells, he subsequently attempted to gain first-hand knowledge of his subject matter. For instance, he spent some time living with the lighthouse keepers at the Bell Rock before writing The Lighthouse, and while researching for Deep Down he spent time with the tin miners of Cornwall.

In 1866 Ballantyne married Jane Grant (c. 1845 – c. 1924), with whom he had three sons and three daughters.

Later life and death

Ballantyne spent his later years in Harrow, London, before moving to Italy for the sake of his health, possibly suffering from undiagnosed Ménière's disease. He died in Rome on 8 February 1894, and was buried in the Protestant Cemetery there.

Legacy
A Greater London Council plaque commemorates Ballantyne at "Duneaves" on Mount Park Road in Harrow.

One of the young men influenced by Ballantyne was Robert Louis Stevenson (1850–94). He was so impressed with the story of The Coral Island (1857) that he based portions of his famous book Treasure Island (1881) on themes found in Ballantyne. He honoured Ballantyne in the introduction to Treasure Island with the following poem:

Works

The Hudson's Bay Company (1848)
The Young Fur Traders (1856)
Mister Fox. A Children's Nursery Rhyme (1856)
Ungava (1857)
The Coral Island (1858)
Martin Rattler (1858)
Handbook to the new Goldfields (1858)
The Dog Crusoe and his Master (1860)
The World of Ice (1860)
The Gorilla Hunters (1861)
The Golden Dream (1861)
The Red Eric (1861)
Away in the Wilderness (1863)
Fighting the Whales (1863)
The Wild Man of the West (1863)
Man on the Ocean (1863)
Fast in the Ice (1863)
Gascoyne (1864)
The Lifeboat (1864)
Chasing the Sun (1864)
Freaks on the Fells (1864)
The Lighthouse (1865)
Fighting The Flames (1867)
Silver Lake (1867)
Deep Down (1868)
Shifting Winds (1868)
Hunting the Lions (1869)
Over the Rocky Mountains (1869)
Saved by the Lifeboat (1869)
Erling the Bold (1869)
The Battle and the Breeze (1869)
Up in the Clouds (1869)
The Cannibal Islands (1869)
Lost in the Forest (1869)
Digging for Gold (1869)
Sunk at Sea (1869)
The Floating Light of the Goodwin Sands (1870)
The Iron Horse (1879)
The Norsemen in the West (1872)
The Pioneers (1872)
Black Ivory (1873)
Life in the Red Brigade (1873)
Fort Desolation (1873)
The Ocean and its Wonders (1874)
The Pirate City: An Algerine Tale (1874)
The Butterfly's Ball and the Grasshopper's Feast (1874)
The Story of the Rock (1875)
Rivers of Ice (1875)
Under the Waves (1876)
The Settler and the Savage (1877)
In the Track of the Troops (1878)
Jarwin and Cuffy (1878)
Philosopher Jack (1879)
Six Months at the Cape (1879)
Post Haste (1880)
The Lonely Island (1880)
The Red Man's Revenge (1880)
My Doggie and I (1881)
The Life of a Ship (1882)
The Kitten Pilgrims (1882)
The Giant of the North (1882)
The Madman and the Pirate (1883)
Battles with the Sea (1883)
The Battery and the Boiler (1883)
The Thorogood Family (1883)
The Young Trawler (1884)
Dusty Diamonds, Cut and Polished (1884)
Twice Bought (1885)
The Island Queen (1885)
The Rover of the Andes (1885)
The Prairie Chief (1886)
The Lively Poll (1886)
Red Rooney (1886)
The Big Otter (1887)
The Fugitives or the Tyrant Queen of Madagascar (1887)
Blue Lights (1888)
The Middy and the Moors (1888)
The Eagle Cliff (1889)
The Crew of the Water Wagtail (1889)
Blown to Bits (1889)
The Garret and the Garden (1890)
Jeff Benson (1890)
Charlie to the Rescue (1890)
The Coxswain's Bride (1891)
The Buffalo Runners (1891)
The Hot Swamp (1892)
Hunted and Harried (1892)
The Walrus Hunters (1893)
An Author's Adventures (1893)
Wrecked but not Ruined (1895)

Example of illustrations from a work by Ballantyne

Edgar Giberne (24 June 185021 September 1889) provided five illustrations for The Blue Lights or Hot Work in the Soudan: A tale of Soldier life in Several of its Phases by Ballantyne (J Nisbet & Co, London, 1888)

See also

References

Bibliography

Further reading

External links

 

R. M. Ballantyne collection at One More Library

R. M. Ballantyne at Fantastic Fiction

1825 births
1894 deaths
Writers from Edinburgh
People educated at Edinburgh Academy
Canadian fur traders
Scottish children's writers
Scottish memoirists
Scottish travel writers
Scottish watercolourists
Burials in the Protestant Cemetery, Rome
19th-century Scottish painters
Scottish male painters
Victorian novelists
19th-century Scottish businesspeople
19th-century Canadian novelists
Canadian male novelists
Hudson's Bay Company people
19th-century Scottish male artists